Kaplan Panesh (born September 4, 1974, Adygeysk) is a Russian political figure and a deputy of the 8th State Duma.
 
At the beginning of the 2000s, Panesh engaged in business and worked as general director of Kubannefteservis LLC. Later he held various positions at various industrial enterprises of Krasnodar Krai and Adygea. In 2006, he became the general director of the Maykop Brewery. From 2011 to 2021, Panesh was the deputy of the State Council of the Republic of Adygea of the 5th and 6th convocations. Since September 2021, he has served as deputy of the 8th State Duma.

References
 

 

1974 births
Living people
Liberal Democratic Party of Russia politicians
21st-century Russian politicians
Eighth convocation members of the State Duma (Russian Federation)
People from Adygeysk